Saint-Pierre-lès-Franqueville is a commune in the Aisne department and Hauts-de-France region of northern France.

Population

See also
Communes of the Aisne department

References

Communes of Aisne
Aisne communes articles needing translation from French Wikipedia